The Helen Wing House is a historic home located in Glens Falls, Warren County, New York. It was built in 1893 and is a rectangular, -story, frame vernacular Queen Anne–style residence. It features a raised 1-story porch and open gallery at the attic level. The architect was Ephraim Potter.

It was added to the National Register of Historic Places in 1984.

References

Houses on the National Register of Historic Places in New York (state)
Queen Anne architecture in New York (state)
Houses completed in 1893
Houses in Warren County, New York
National Register of Historic Places in Warren County, New York